Kantanshi is a constituency of the National Assembly of Zambia. It covers the centre of Mufulira and a rural area to the north-east of the town in Mufulira District of Copperbelt Province.

List of MPs

References

Constituencies of the National Assembly of Zambia
Constituencies established in 1968
1968 establishments in Zambia